Thomas Brathwait D.D. was an English academic administrator at the University of Oxford.

Brathwait was elected Warden (head) of New College, Oxford, in 1702, a post he held until 1712.
During his time as Warden of New College, he was also Vice-Chancellor of Oxford University from 1710 until 1712. Thereafter he was warden of Winchester College.

References

Year of birth missing
Year of death missing
Wardens of New College, Oxford
Vice-Chancellors of the University of Oxford
18th-century scholars
Wardens of Winchester College